Loryma hypotialis is a species of snout moth in the genus Loryma. It was described by Charles Swinhoe in 1886, and is known from India (including Pune, the type location).

References

Moths described in 1886
Pyralini
Moths of Asia